Chenopodium album  is a fast-growing weedy annual plant in the genus Chenopodium. Though cultivated in some regions, the plant is elsewhere considered a weed. Common names include lamb's quarters, melde, goosefoot, wild spinach and fat-hen, though the latter two are also applied to other species of the genus Chenopodium, for which reason it is often distinguished as white goosefoot. Chenopodium album is extensively cultivated and consumed in Northern India, Nepal, and Pakistan  as a food crop known as bathua.

Distribution
Its native range is obscure due to extensive cultivation, but includes most of Europe, from where Linnaeus described the species in 1753. Plants native in eastern Asia are included under C. album, but often differ from European specimens. It is widely naturalised elsewhere, e.g. Africa, Australasia, North America, and Oceania, and now occurs almost everywhere (except Antarctica) in soils rich in nitrogen, especially on wasteland.

Description
It tends to grow upright at first, reaching heights of 10–150 cm (rarely to 3 m), but typically becomes recumbent after flowering (due to the weight of the foliage and seeds) unless supported by other plants. The leaves are alternate and varied in appearance. The first leaves, near the base of the plant, are toothed and roughly diamond-shaped, 3–7 cm long and 3–6 cm broad. The leaves on the upper part of the flowering stems are entire and lanceolate-rhomboid, 1–5 cm long and 0.4–2 cm broad; they are waxy-coated, unwettable and mealy in appearance, with a whitish coat on the underside. The small flowers are radially symmetrical and grow in small cymes on a dense branched inflorescence 10–40 cm long. Further, the flowers are bisexual and female, with five tepals which are mealy on outer surface, and shortly united at the base. There are five stamens.

Taxonomy
Chenopodium album has a very complex taxonomy and has been divided in numerous microspecies, subspecies and varieties, but it is difficult to differentiate between them. The following infraspecific taxa are accepted by the Flora Europaea:
 Chenopodium album subsp. album
 Chenopodium album subsp. striatum (Krašan) Murr
 Chenopodium album var. reticulatum (Aellen) Uotila

Published names and synonyms include C. album var. microphyllum, C. album var. stevensii, C. acerifolium, C. centrorubrum, C. giganteum, C. jenissejense, C. lanceolatum, C. pedunculare and C. probstii.

It also hybridises readily with several other Chenopodium species, including C. berlandieri, C. ficifolium, C. opulifolium, C. strictum and C. suecicum.

Cultivation

Regions
The species are cultivated as a grain or vegetable crop (such as in lieu of spinach), as well as animal feed in Asia and Africa, whereas in Europe and North America, it is commonly regarded as a weed in places such as potato fields, while in Australia it is naturalised in all states and regarded as an environmental weed in New South Wales, Victoria, Western Australia and the Northern Territory.

Potential impact on conventional crops
It is one of the more robust and competitive weeds, capable of producing crop losses of up to 13% in corn, 25% in soybeans, and 48% in sugar beets at an average plant distribution. It may be controlled by dark tillage, rotary hoeing, or flaming when the plants are small.  Crop rotation of small grains will suppress an infestation.  It is easily controlled with a number of pre-emergence herbicides. Its pollen may contribute to hay fever-like allergies.

Pest control
Chenopodium album is vulnerable to leaf miners, making it a useful trap crop as a companion plant. Growing near other plants, it attracts leaf miners which might otherwise have attacked the crop to be protected. It is a host plant for the beet leafhopper, an insect which transmits curly top virus to beet crops.

Uses and consumption

Nutrition
Raw lamb's quarters are 84% water, 7% carbohydrates, 4% protein, and 1% fat (table). In a 100 gram reference amount, lamb's quarters provide 43 calories, and are a rich source (20% or more of the Daily Value, DV) of protein, vitamin C (96% DV), vitamin A (73% DV), riboflavin (37% DV), vitamin B6 (21% DV), manganese (37% DV), and calcium (31% DV), with several other dietary minerals in lesser amounts (table).

Culinary use

The leaves and young shoots may be eaten raw or cooked as a leaf vegetable, but should be eaten in moderation due to high levels of oxalic acid. The flower buds and flowers can also be eaten cooked. Each plant produces tens of thousands of black seeds. Quinoa, a closely related species, is grown specifically for its seeds.  The Zuni people cook the young plants' greens.

Archaeologists analysing carbonized plant remains found in storage pits and ovens at Iron Age, Viking Age, and Roman sites in Europe have found its seeds mixed with conventional grains and even inside the stomachs of Danish bog bodies.

In India, the plant is called bathua and found abundantly in the winter season. The leaves and young shoots of this plant are used in dishes such as soups, curries, and paratha-stuffed breads, common in North India. The seeds or grains are used in phambra or laafi, gruel-type dishes in Himachal Pradesh, and in mildly alcoholic fermented beverages such as soora and ghanti. In Haryana state, the "bathue ka raita" i.e. the raita (yogurt dip) made with bathua, is very popular in winters. Bathua seeds also double up for rice and dal. Napoleon Bonaparte is said to have once relied on bathua seeds to feed his troops during lean times.

In Nepal, it is known as bethe or bethu. It is used to make dish known as saag. The leaves are stir fried with spices, chilly and diced garlic. A fermented dish known as masaura is also made by dipping the leaves in a lentil batter with spices and then dried in sun for some days. The fermented masaura can be made into a curry and served with rice. It is also used to make an instant salad-style-achaar and chutneys.

Animal feed
As some of the common names suggest, it is also used as feed (both the leaves and the seeds) for chickens and other poultry.

Construction
The juice of this plant is a potent ingredient for a mixture of wall plaster, according to the Samarāṅgaṇa Sūtradhāra, which is a Sanskrit treatise dealing with Śilpaśāstra (Hindu science of art and construction).

Ayurveda
In Ayurveda traditional medicine, bathua is thought to be useful for treating various diseases, although there is no clinical evidence such uses are safe or effective.

Gallery

References
Footnotes

Citations

External links

album
Flora of Europe
Flora of temperate Asia
Flora of tropical Asia
Flora of North Africa
Edible nuts and seeds
Leaf vegetables
Plants described in 1753
Plants used in Native American cuisine
Plants used in traditional African medicine
Taxa named by Carl Linnaeus